In mathematical analysis, the spaces of test functions and distributions are topological vector spaces (TVSs) that are used in the definition and application of distributions. 
Test functions are usually infinitely differentiable complex-valued (or sometimes real-valued) functions on a non-empty open subset  that have compact support. 

There are other possible choices for the space of test functions, which lead to other different spaces of distributions. If  then the use of Schwartz functions as test functions gives rise to a certain subspace of  whose elements are called . These are important because they allow the Fourier transform to be extended from "standard functions" to tempered distributions. The set of tempered distributions forms a vector subspace of the space of distributions  and is thus one example of a space of distributions; there are many other spaces of distributions.

There also exist other major classes of test functions that are  subsets of  such as spaces of analytic test functions, which produce very different classes of distributions. The theory of such distributions has a different character from the previous one because there are no analytic functions with non-empty compact support. Use of analytic test functions leads to Sato's theory of hyperfunctions.

Notation

The following notation will be used throughout this article:

  denotes the natural numbers.
  will denote a non-negative integer or 
 For two functions , the following notation defines a canonical pairing: 

Definitions of test functions and distributions

With minor modifications, one can also define complex-valued distributions, and one can replace  with any (paracompact) smooth manifold.

This topology is unfortunately not easy to define but it is nevertheless still possible to characterize distributions in a way so that no mention of the canonical LF-topology is made.

 For every compact subset  there exist constants  and  such that for all  with support contained in  

To define the space of distributions we must first define the canonical LF-topology, which in turn requires that several other locally convex topological vector spaces (TVSs) be defined first.
This finally permits consideration of more advanced notions such as convergence of distributions (both sequences  nets), various (sub)spaces of distributions, and operations on distributions, including extending differential equations to distributions.

Choice of compact sets K 

Topology on Ck(U)

We now introduce the seminorms that will define the topology on  Different authors sometimes use different families of seminorms so we list the most common families below. However, the resulting topology is the same no matter which family is used.

All of the functions above are non-negative -valued seminorms on  As explained in this article, every set of seminorms on a vector space induces a locally convex vector topology.

Each of the following sets of seminorms 

With this topology,  becomes a locally convex Fréchet space that is  normable.

Metric defining the topology

For example, using the seminorms  results in the metric 

Often, it is easier to just consider seminorms.

Topology on Ck(K)

As before, fix  Recall that if  is any compact subset of  then 

For any compact subset   is a closed subspace of the Fréchet space  and is thus also a Fréchet space.

If  is finite then  is a Banach space with a topology that can be defined by the norm

And when  then  is even a Hilbert space. The space  is a distinguished Schwartz Montel space so if  then it is  normable and thus  a Banach space (although like all other  it is a Fréchet space).

Trivial extensions and independence of Ck(K)'s topology from U

The definition of  depends on  so we will let  denote the topological space  which by definition is a topological subspace of  Suppose  is an open subset of  containing  and for any compact subset  let  is the vector subspace of  consisting of maps with support contained in   Given  its  is by definition, the function  defined by:

This map is a linear injection and for every compact subset  (where  is also a compact subset of  since ) we have 

If  is restricted to  then the following induced linear map is a homeomorphism (and thus a TVS-isomorphism):

and thus the next two maps (which like the previous map are defined by ) are topological embeddings:

Using the injection

This justifies the practice of written  instead of

Canonical LF topology

Recall that  denote all those functions in  that have compact support in  where note that  is the union of all  as  ranges over  Moreover, for every ,  is a dense subset of  The special case when  gives us the space of test functions.

This section defines the canonical LF topology as a direct limit. It is also possible to define this topology in terms of its neighborhoods of the origin, which is described afterwards.

Topology defined by direct limits

For all compact  satisfying  there are inclusion maps

Recall from above that the map  is a topological embedding. The collection of maps 
This system's direct limit (in the category of locally convex TVSs) is the pair  where  are the natural inclusions and where  is now endowed with the (unique) strongest locally convex topology making all of the inclusion maps  continuous.

Topology defined by neighborhoods of the origin

If  is a convex subset of  then  is a neighborhood of the origin in the canonical LF topology if and only if it satisfies the following condition:

Note that any convex set satisfying this condition is necessarily absorbing in  Since the topology of any topological vector space is translation-invariant, any TVS-topology is completely determined by the set of neighborhood of the origin. This means that one could actually  the canonical LF topology by declaring that a convex balanced subset  is a neighborhood of the origin if and only if it satisfies condition .

Topology defined via differential operators

A  is a sum

Properties of the canonical LF topology

Canonical LF topology's independence from 

One benefit of defining the canonical LF topology as the direct limit of a direct system is that we may immediately use the universal property of direct limits. Another benefit is that we can use well-known results from category theory to deduce that the canonical LF topology is actually independent of the particular choice of the directed collection  of compact sets. And by considering different collections  (in particular, those  mentioned at the beginning of this article), we may deduce different properties of this topology. In particular, we may deduce that the canonical LF topology makes  into a Hausdorff locally convex strict LF-space (and also a strict LB-space if ), which of course is the reason why this topology is called "the canonical LF topology" (see this footnote for more details).

Universal property

Dependence of the canonical LF topology on 

This map is a continuous linear map.

Bounded subsets

Non-metrizability

It follows from Baire's theorem that  is  metrizable and thus also  normable (see this footnote for an explanation of how the non-metrizable space  can be complete even though it does not admit a metric).

Relationships between spaces

Using the universal property of direct limits and the fact that the natural inclusions  are all topological embedding, one may show that all of the maps  are also topological embeddings.

Said differently, the reason why there are so many different ways of defining distributions from other spaces ultimately stems from how very fine the canonical LF topology is.

Other properties

 The differentiation map  is a surjective continuous linear operator.

Distributions

One interprets this notation as the distribution  acting on the test function  to give a scalar, or symmetrically as the test function  acting on the distribution .

Characterizations of distributions

Proposition. If  is a linear functional on  then the following are equivalent:

  is a distribution;
  :  is a continuous function.
  is continuous at the origin.
  is uniformly continuous.
  is a bounded operator.
  is sequentially continuous.
  is sequentially continuous at the origin; in other words,  maps null sequences to null sequences.
  maps null sequences to bounded subsets.
  maps Mackey convergent null sequences to bounded subsets; 
 explicitly, for every Mackey convergent null sequence  in  the sequence  is bounded.
 a sequence  is said to be  if there exists a divergent sequence  of positive real number such that the sequence  is bounded; every sequence that is Mackey convergent to  necessarily converges to the origin (in the usual sense).

 There exists a continuous seminorm  on  such that 
 For every compact subset  there exist constants  and  such that for all  
 For every compact subset  there exist constants  and  such that for all  with support contained in  
 For any compact subset  and any sequence  in  if  converges uniformly to zero for all multi-indices  then 
 Any of the  statements immediately above (that is, statements 14, 15, and 16) but with the additional requirement that compact set  belongs to

Topology on the space of distributions

The topology of uniform convergence on bounded subsets is also called . This topology is chosen because it is with this topology that  becomes a nuclear Montel space and it is with this topology that the kernels theorem of Schwartz holds. No matter which topology is chosen,  will be a non-metrizable, locally convex topological vector space. The space  is separable and has the strong Pytkeev property but it is neither a k-space nor a sequential space, which in particular implies that it is not metrizable and also that its topology can  be defined using only sequences.

Topological properties

Topological vector space categories

The canonical LF topology makes  into a complete distinguished strict LF-space (and a strict LB-space if and only if ), which implies that  is a meager subset of itself. Furthermore,  as well as its strong dual space, is a complete Hausdorff locally convex barrelled bornological Mackey space.

The three spaces   and the Schwartz space  as well as the strong duals of each of these three spaces, are complete nuclear Montel bornological spaces, which implies that all six of these locally convex spaces are also paracompact reflexive barrelled Mackey spaces.

Convergent sequences

Convergent sequences and their insufficiency to describe topologies

Moreover, neither the space of test functions  nor its strong dual  is a sequential space (not even an Ascoli space), which in particular implies that their topologies can  be defined entirely in terms of convergent sequences.

 There is a compact set  containing the supports of all 
 For each multi-index  the sequence of partial derivatives  tends uniformly to 

Neither the space  nor its strong dual  is a sequential space, and consequently, their topologies can  be defined entirely in terms of convergent sequences. For this reason, the above characterization of when a sequence converges is  enough to define the canonical LF topology on  The same can be said of the strong dual topology on

What sequences do characterize

Nevertheless, sequences do characterize many important properties, as we now discuss. It is known that in the dual space of any Montel space, a sequence converges in the strong dual topology if and only if it converges in the weak* topology, which in particular, is the reason why a sequence of distributions converges (in the strong dual topology) if and only if it converges pointwise (this leads many authors to use pointwise convergence to actually  the convergence of a sequence of distributions; this is fine for sequences but it does  extend to the convergence of nets of distributions since a net may converge pointwise but fail to converge in the strong dual topology).

Sequences characterize continuity of linear maps valued in locally convex space. Suppose  is a locally convex bornological space (such as any of the six TVSs mentioned earlier). More generally, such a linear map  is continuous if and only if it maps Mackey convergent null sequences to bounded subsets of  So in particular, if a linear map  into a locally convex space is sequentially continuous at the origin then it is continuous. However, this does  necessarily extend to non-linear maps and/or to maps valued in topological spaces that are not locally convex TVSs.

Sequences of distributions

for every test function  For example, if  is the function

as  so  in  Thus, for large  the function  can be regarded as an approximation of the Dirac delta distribution.

Other properties

Localization of distributions

Preliminaries: Transpose of a linear operator

Operations on distributions and spaces of distributions are often defined by means of the transpose of a linear operator. This is because the transpose allows for a unified presentation of the many definitions in the theory of distributions and also because its properties are well known in functional analysis. For instance, the well-known Hermitian adjoint of a linear operator between Hilbert spaces is just the operator's transpose (but with the Riesz representation theorem used to identify each Hilbert space with its continuous dual space). In general the transpose of a continuous linear map  is the linear map 
 
or equivalently, it is the unique map satisfying  for all  and all  (the prime symbol in  does not denote a derivative of any kind; it merely indicates that  is an element of the continuous dual space ). Since  is continuous, the transpose  is also continuous when both duals are endowed with their respective strong dual topologies; it is also continuous when both duals are endowed with their respective weak* topologies (see the articles polar topology and dual system for more details).

In the context of distributions, the characterization of the transpose can be refined slightly. Let  be a continuous linear map.

where the right hand side equals

Extensions and restrictions to an open subset

Let  be open subsets of  
This assignment  defines the  operator 
 
which is a continuous injective linear map.
Its transpose (explained here) 
 

If  then the (continuous injective linear) trivial extension map  is  a topological embedding (in other words, if this linear injection was used to identify  as a subset of  then 's topology would strictly finer than the subspace topology that  induces on it; importantly, it would  be a topological subspace since that requires equality of topologies) and its range is also  dense in its codomain  Consequently, if  then the restriction mapping is neither injective nor surjective.

Spaces of distributions

For all  and all  all of the following canonical injections are continuous and have an image/range that is a dense subset of their codomain:

where the topologies on the LB-spaces  are the canonical LF topologies as defined below (so in particular, they are not the usual norm topologies). 
The range of each of the maps above (and of any composition of the maps above) is dense in the codomain. Indeed,  is even sequentially dense in every  For every  the canonical inclusion  into the normed space  (here  has its usual norm topology) is a continuous linear injection and the range of this injection is dense in its codomain if and only if  .

Suppose that  is one of the LF-spaces  (for ) or LB-spaces  (for ) or normed spaces  (for ). Because the canonical injection  is a continuous injection whose image is dense in the codomain, this map's transpose  is a continuous injection. This continuous transpose map is not necessarily a TVS-embedding so the topology that this map transfers from its domain to the image  is finer than the subspace topology that this space inherits from  
Almost all of the spaces of distributions mentioned in this article arise in this way (e.g. tempered distribution, restrictions, distributions of order  some integer, distributions induced by a positive Radon measure, distributions induced by an -function, etc.) and any representation theorem about the dual space of  may, through the transpose  be transferred directly to elements of the space

Compactly supported Lp-spaces

The set  is a closed vector subspace  and is thus a Banach space and when  even a Hilbert space. 
Let  be the union of all  as  ranges over all compact subsets of  
Endow  with the final topology (direct limit topology) induced by the inclusion maps  as  ranges over all compact subsets of  
This topology makes  into an LB-space (and thus also an LF-space) with a topology that is strictly finer than the norm (subspace) topology that  induces on it.

Radon measures

The inclusion map  is a continuous injection whose image is dense in its codomain, so the transpose  is also a continuous injection.

Note that the continuous dual space  can be identified as the space of Radon measures, where there is a one-to-one correspondence between the continuous linear functionals  and integral with respect to a Radon measure; that is,

 if  then there exists a Radon measure  on  such that for all  and

If  is a locally integrable function on  then the distribution  is a Radon measure; so Radon measures form a large and important space of distributions.

The following is the theorem of the structure of distributions of Radon measures, which shows that every Radon measure can be written as a sum of derivatives of locally  functions in  :

Positive Radon measures

Lebesgue measure is an example of a positive Radon measure.

Locally integrable functions as distributions

One particularly important class of Radon measures are those that are induced locally integrable functions. This is a large class of functions which includes all continuous functions and all Lp space  functions.

In a similar manner, every Radon measure  on  defines an element of  whose value on the test function  is  As above, it is conventional to abuse notation and write the pairing between a Radon measure  and a test function  as  Conversely, as shown in a theorem by Schwartz (similar to the Riesz representation theorem), every distribution which is non-negative on non-negative functions is of this form for some (positive) Radon measure.

Test functions as distributions

The test functions are themselves locally integrable, and so define distributions. Or equivalently,

Furthermore,  is also sequentially dense in the strong dual space of

Distributions with compact support

The inclusion map  is a continuous injection whose image is dense in its codomain, so the transpose  is also a continuous injection.

The elements of  can be identified as the space of distributions with compact support. Explicitly, if  is a distribution on  then the following are equivalent,

 ;

Conversely, it can be shown that every continuous linear functional on this space defines a distribution of compact support.

Distributions of finite order

Let  The inclusion map  is a continuous injection whose image is dense in its codomain, so the transpose  is also a continuous injection.

Structure of distributions of finite order

The following is the theorem of the structure of distributions of finite order, which shows that every distribution of finite order can be written as a sum of derivatives of Radon measures:

Example. (Distributions of infinite order) Let  and for every test function  let

Tempered distributions and Fourier transform 

Tempered distributions are useful if one studies the Fourier transform since all tempered distributions have a Fourier transform, which is not true for an arbitrary distribution in 

Schwartz space

The Schwartz space,  is the space of all smooth functions that are rapidly decreasing at infinity along with all partial derivatives. Thus  is in the Schwartz space provided that any derivative of  multiplied with any power of  converges to 0 as  These functions form a complete TVS with a suitably defined family of seminorms. More precisely, for any multi-indices  and  define:

Then  is in the Schwartz space if all the values satisfy:

The family of seminorms  defines a locally convex topology on the Schwartz space. For  the seminorms are, in fact, norms on the Schwartz space. One can also use the following family of seminorms to define the topology:

Otherwise, one can define a norm on  via

The Schwartz space is a Fréchet space (i.e. a complete metrizable locally convex space).

The Schwartz space is nuclear and the tensor product of two maps induces a canonical surjective TVS-isomorphisms

where  represents the completion of the injective tensor product (which in this case is the identical to the completion of the projective tensor product).

Tempered distributions

The inclusion map  is a continuous injection whose image is dense in its codomain, so the transpose  is also a continuous injection.

It is the continuous dual of the Schwartz space. Equivalently, a distribution  is a tempered distribution if and only if

The derivative of a tempered distribution is again a tempered distribution. Tempered distributions generalize the bounded (or slow-growing) locally integrable functions; all distributions with compact support and all square-integrable functions are tempered distributions.

Fourier transform

To study the Fourier transform, it is best to consider complex-valued test functions and complex-linear distributions. The Fourier transform is a TVS isomorphism from the space of tempered distributions onto itself. This operation is compatible with differentiation in the sense that

In particular, the Fourier transform of the constant function equal to 1 is the  distribution.

Expressing tempered distributions as sums of derivatives

If  is a tempered distribution, then there exists a constant  and positive integers  and  such that for all Schwartz functions 

This estimate along with some techniques from functional analysis can be used to show that there is a continuous slowly increasing function  and a multi-index  such that

Restriction of distributions to compact sets

Tensor product of distributions

Let  and  be open sets. Assume all vector spaces to be over the field  where  or  For  define for every  and every  the following functions:

Given  and  define the following functions:

where  and  

Schwartz kernel theorem

The tensor product defines a bilinear map

the span of the range of this map is a dense subspace of its codomain. Furthermore,  Moreover  induces continuous bilinear maps:

Why does such a result hold for the space of distributions and test functions but not for other "nice" spaces like the Hilbert space ? This question led Alexander Grothendieck to discover nuclear spaces, nuclear maps, and the injective tensor product. He ultimately showed that it is precisely because  is a nuclear space that the Schwartz kernel theorem holds. Like Hilbert spaces, nuclear spaces may be thought as of generalizations of finite dimensional Euclidean space.

Using holomorphic functions as test functions

The success of the theory led to investigation of the idea of hyperfunction, in which spaces of holomorphic functions are used as test functions. A refined theory has been developed, in particular Mikio Sato's algebraic analysis, using sheaf theory and several complex variables. This extends the range of symbolic methods that can be made into rigorous mathematics, for example Feynman integrals.

See also

Notes

References

Bibliography

 
 .
 
.
 .
 .
 .
 .
  
  
  
 .
  
  
 .
 .
 .
 .
 .

Further reading

 M. J. Lighthill (1959). Introduction to Fourier Analysis and Generalised Functions. Cambridge University Press.  (requires very little knowledge of analysis; defines distributions as limits of sequences of functions under integrals)
 V.S. Vladimirov (2002). Methods of the theory of generalized functions. Taylor & Francis. 
 .
 .
 .
 .
 .

Functional analysis
Generalized functions
Generalizations of the derivative
Smooth functions
Topological vector spaces
Schwartz distributions